The 2003 Big West Conference men's basketball tournament was held March 13–15 at Anaheim Convention Center in Anaheim, California.

Utah State defeated  in the championship game, 57–54, to obtain the fifth Big West Conference men's basketball tournament championship in school history.

The Aggies participated in the 2003 NCAA Division I men's basketball tournament after earning the conference's automatic bid.

Format

Teams were seeded based on regular season conference records.

Bracket

References

Big West Conference men's basketball tournament
Tournament
Big West Conference men's basketball tournament
Big West Conference men's basketball tournament